The lamellar body count is a test for assessing fetal lung maturity.

References
3. Laboratory Testing To Assess Fetal Lung
Maturity
Darlynn J. Lafler, BS MT(ASCP)CLS, and Arturo Mendoza, MD
From the Sharp Mary Birch Hospital for Women Department of Pathology, San Diego, CA
laboratorymedicine> July 2001> number 7> volume 32

Embryology
Tests during pregnancy